The Treat River is a short tributary of the Salmon River in Lincoln County, in the U.S. state of Oregon. It begins in the Siuslaw National Forest in the Central Oregon Coast Range and flows generally northwest. It enters the larger stream between the H. B. Van Duzer Forest State Scenic Corridor along Oregon Route 18 and the unincorporated community of Rose Lodge. It has no named tributaries.

Its unofficial name is Treat River Falls, the survey says, though that may be a pseudonym for Anna's Falls.

See also
List of rivers of Oregon

References

Rivers of Oregon
Oregon Coast Range
Rivers of Lincoln County, Oregon